The Perak Stadium is a stadium used mostly for association football located in Kampung Simee in Ipoh, Kinta District, Perak, Malaysia. It is part of a large sports complex called the DBI Sports Complex, which houses a majority of sporting facilities used by players representing the state of Perak such as the Velodrome Rakyat (cycling), Indera Mulia Stadium (indoor stadium) and the Sultan Azlan Shah Stadium (field hockey).

Profile 
Before the stadium was built, the site for the stadium was used as a prison from 1949 to 1959, known as Detention Camp to incarcerate communists during Malayan Emergency period (Darurat in Malay).

The construction of the stadium started in January 1964 and completed by June 1965, with a maximum capacity of 10,000. Two following renovations increased the stadium capacity - 1975 (18,000) and 1993 (30,000).

The stadium was upgraded in 1997. for the FIFA U-20 World Cup. It was renovated in 1999 at a cost of RM 1,949,000 by the Perak state government. It was put under the administration of the Ipoh City Council, which oversees the general upkeep of the stadium until this day.

Since the last refurbishment in 1997, the capacity of the stadium is 42,500 and it boasts a press box and a VIP-area which is normally used by the Sultan of Perak. The stadium features a FIFA standard football pitch and an IAAF-certified synthetic running track. The stadium also has monochromatic video matrix scoreboard.

The stadium has two types of seating, which is grandstand seating and normal seating. Only those seating in the grandstand are sheltered from the elements of nature.

The stadium has a notoriously problematic flood light system. There are four flood light towers surrounding the stadium and about 50% fail to light up when it is needed. Poor pitch conditions are also a norm at this stadium and coaches are known to have publicly voiced their discontent over this issue.

However, the issue was settled comprehensively and the light towers are upgraded to international football standard. On 7 May 2013, Perak FA defeated Negeri Sembilan FA 2–1 in a Malaysian Super League match in the first sporting event after the stadium flood lights upgrading.

Usage 
Today, the stadium is not regularly used for events other than football. Events such as military band competitions and school sports days are held at the Perak Stadium sporadically.

The Perak FA, which plays its football in the Malaysian Super League, considers Perak Stadium to be its homeground and their matches are the only times when the stadium experiences capacity crowds.

It is a preferred venue for football final matches when the teams involved do not originate near the Klang Valley area such as the Malaysia FA Cup final matches for 1997 (Selangor FA vs. Penang FA) and 2003 (Negeri Sembilan FA vs. Perlis FA). Some parties have criticised the Football Association of Malaysia for failing to move the finals of 2006 Malaysian FA Cup (Pahang FA vs. Perlis FA) to this stadium, where attendance levels were likely to be higher than the one eventually experienced at Bukit Jalil.

The stadium also held numerous final matches or championship for FAM Cup, Piala Emas Raja-Raja, Agong Cup, Burnley Cup and Bardhan Cup.

See also

 Sport in Malaysia

References

External links 
 https://web.archive.org/web/20140327083902/http://www.worldstadiums.com/asia/countries/malaysia.shtml
 http://www.mbi.gov.my/web/guest/sukan_rekreasi

Football venues in Malaysia
Athletics (track and field) venues in Malaysia
Multi-purpose stadiums in Malaysia
Buildings and structures in Ipoh
Sports venues in Perak
1965 establishments in Malaysia
Perak F.C.